The  is one of the two lines of the Kyoto Municipal Subway operated by Kyoto Municipal Transportation Bureau in Kyoto, Japan. On maps, diagrams and signboards, the line is colored green, and its stations are given numbers following the letter "K". It serves seven of Kyoto's eleven wards: Sakyō-ku, Kita-ku, Kamigyō-ku, Nakagyō-ku, Shimogyō-ku, Minami-ku, and Fushimi-ku.

They also connect to the JR lines at Kyoto Station and the Hankyu Kyoto Line running beneath Shijō Street at the intersection of Shijō Karasuma, Kyoto's central business district. At Shijō Karasuma, the subway station is named , whereas Hankyu's station is called .

The Transportation Bureau and Kintetsu Railway jointly operate through services, which continue to the Kintetsu Kyoto Line to Kintetsu Nara Station in Nara. The Karasuma Line and the Kyoto Line connect at Kyoto and Takeda.

This line covers a total distance of 13.7 km in 26 minutes and the average daily ridership in 2009 was 411,881 passengers.

Stations

Rolling stock

Kyoto Municipal Transportation Bureau 
 10 series
 20 series

Kintetsu Railway Co., Ltd. 
 Kintetsu 3200 series
 Kintetsu 3220 series

History
Oike Station was renamed Karasuma Oike Station on May 22, 1997, prior to the  inauguration of the Tōzai Line running beneath the east-west .

References
This article was translated from the corresponding article in the Japanese Wikipedia, retrieved on July 4, 2009.

External links 
 Public transport in Kyoto  (Kyoto City Web)

Kyoto Municipal Subway
Standard gauge railways in Japan
Railway lines opened in 1981
1981 establishments in Japan